Ctenucha rubriceps is a moth of the family Erebidae. It was described by Francis Walker in 1854. It is found in Mexico, Guatemala, Costa Rica, Colombia, Venezuela, Brazil (São Paulo, Rio de Janeiro), Argentina and Uruguay.

References

rubriceps
Moths described in 1854